The Smith & Wesson Model 1000 is a semi-automatic shotgun offered in 12 and 20 gauge by Smith & Wesson during the 1970s and 1980s. The shotguns were developed and manufactured in Japan by Howa Machinery.

History
The Model 1000 was available in 12-gauge and 20-gauge, with trap (1000T) and skeet (1000S) variants. Both gauges were offered with  chambers; the 12-gauge was also sold with a  chamber for magnum shotshells.

The Model 1000 was offered by Smith & Wesson from 1973 to 1985. It was subsequently sold by Mossberg for a few additional years.

References

External links
 Smith and Wesson M1000 Disassembly via YouTube
 Smith and Wesson Semi Auto 12 Gauge model 1000 via YouTube

Smith & Wesson firearms
Semi-automatic shotguns